One Tree Hill ( or ) is a suburb of Auckland, New Zealand. The residential part of the suburb is located to the east and south-east of Maungakiekie / One Tree Hill, from which it takes its name, with the volcanic peak located within the suburb's boundaries.

The suburb was established in the 1930s. Many period bungalows remain. Cornwall Park and Maungakiekie are major attractions within the suburb.

Demographics

One Tree Hill had a population of 4,506 at the 2018 New Zealand census, an increase of 345 people (8.3%) since the 2013 census, and an increase of 381 people (9.2%) since the 2006 census. There were 1,680 households, comprising 2,169 males and 2,340 females, giving a sex ratio of 0.93 males per female. The median age was 34.7 years (compared with 37.4 years nationally), with 810 people (18.0%) aged under 15 years, 945 (21.0%) aged 15 to 29, 2,301 (51.1%) aged 30 to 64, and 450 (10.0%) aged 65 or older.

Ethnicities were 65.3% European/Pākehā, 8.5% Māori, 10.9% Pacific peoples, 24.0% Asian, and 3.3% other ethnicities. People may identify with more than one ethnicity.

The percentage of people born overseas was 35.8, compared with 27.1% nationally.

Although some people chose not to answer the census's question about religious affiliation, 47.2% had no religion, 38.6% were Christian, 0.4% had Māori religious beliefs, 2.7% were Hindu, 2.1% were Muslim, 1.6% were Buddhist and 1.7% had other religions.

Of those at least 15 years old, 1,581 (42.8%) people had a bachelor's or higher degree, and 318 (8.6%) people had no formal qualifications. The median income was $45,000, compared with $31,800 nationally. 1,116 people (30.2%) earned over $70,000 compared to 17.2% nationally. The employment status of those at least 15 was that 2,205 (59.7%) people were employed full-time, 483 (13.1%) were part-time, and 129 (3.5%) were unemployed.

Education

Notable people
 Arthur Hall (1880–1931), MP for the Reform Party and farmer (was born in One Tree Hill)

Mayors
One Tree Hill existed as a separate borough from 1930 until 1989, when it was absorbed into Auckland City. During that time, the borough had eight mayors:

References

Suburbs of Auckland